Luis Ismael Díaz Ramírez (born 21 August 1990), nicknamed Pinta, is a Dominican footballer who plays for Cibao FC and the Dominican Republic national team as a fullback.

Club career
Born in Santo Domingo, Díaz is a product of the Bob Soccer School FC, playing for its first team in the extinct Liga Mayor. In 2015, when the new league (Liga Dominicana de Fútbol) was created which Bob Soccer is not part, Díaz moved to Club Barcelona Atlético (former Barcelona FC).

International career
Díaz made his international debut for Dominican Republic on 7 September 2014, starting in a 10–0 win against Anguilla for the 2017 Caribbean Cup qualification.

International goals
Scores and results list Dominican Republic's goal tally first.

References

External links
 
 
 
 

1990 births
Living people
Sportspeople from Santo Domingo
Dominican Republic footballers
Association football fullbacks
Association football central defenders
Liga Dominicana de Fútbol players
Club Barcelona Atlético players
Dominican Republic international footballers